Brian Collamore (born November 28, 1950) is an American politician who has served in the Vermont Senate from the Rutland district since 2015.

References

1950 births
Living people
Republican Party Vermont state senators
21st-century American politicians